is a centre for the performing arts located in Ikebukuro, Toshima, Tokyo, Japan. It opened in 1990 and is operated by Tokyo Metropolitan Foundation for History and Culture. There is a concert hall with 1999 seats and a playhouse with 834 seats as well as a number of smaller spaces. Yoshinobu Ashihara was the architect, with acoustical design by Nagata Acoustics.

See also
 Suntory Hall
 Tokyo Bunka Kaikan
 Sumida Triphony Hall
 Ikebukuro Station

References

External links 
 

Theatres in Tokyo
Music venues in Tokyo
Concert halls in Japan
Arts centres in Japan
Music venues completed in 1990
Theatres completed in 1990
1990 establishments in Japan
Buildings and structures in Toshima
Ikebukuro